Nadir Sedrati (born 26 March 1938), known as The Canal Cutter, is a French serial killer who was convicted of killing and dismembering three people from May to July 1999, whose remains he would later dump in the Marne–Rhine Canal near Nancy. He is also suspected in at least two disappearances dating back to 1982, for which he was never charged.

Early life
Nadir Sedrati was born on 26 March 1938 in the village of Gavet in Isère, the younger of two boys born to Algerian immigrants. His father died when he was three, and due to the ongoing World War and her mother's incapability to take care of them, the two brothers were placed in an orphanage. Shortly afterwards, Sedrati's older brother, Milhoud, was expelled due to being overtly violent, but Nadir was allowed to stay due to his more calm and intelligent nature.

On October 2, 1946, at the age of 8 and a half, Sedrati was baptized at the church in Douvaine. As he was frequently called 'Dominique' instead of his given name, he grew up with the impression that that was his real name until January 1952, when he checked his identity papers and learned his true name. In addition to this, he learned that his father, whom he had never met, had died during the Second World War, which left a mark on the impressionable young man which subsequently led him to commit petty crimes.

First scams
In 1957, at the age of 19, Sedrati joined the army in Algeria, where he planned to set up a scam, but was quickly arrested. He was then dishonorably discharged, but avoided prison time due to his age, as the age of majority was 21 at the time. In 1962, he was arrested for several counts of fraud and imprisoned. During this time, he underwent several psychiatric tests, and while most of the results deemed him as responsible for his actions, others were met with mixed reception from psychiatrists. After his release, he would be imprisoned on fifteen additional occasions, but would sometimes be interned at a psychiatric hospital to avoid penal sanctions.

In 1969, Sedrati returned to Algeria to meet his girlfriend's parents, as he wanted to propose to her - however, they rejected the "presumed Algerian" due to his French name, the fact that he was uncircumsized and that he could not speak a word of Arabic. This greatly affected Sedrati, and from then on he frequently felt lonely and rejected by the world. During the 1970s and early 1980s, he alternated between spending time in prison and various psychiatric hospitals. According to him, one of "mental abnormalities" was supposedly covering himself in honey to prevent attacks from extraterrestrials.

During one of his prison stints, he became acquainted with a fellow inmate, 42-year-old André Gachy, with whom he became good friends. After his release in early 1982, Sedrati decided to move in with his new friend at the latter's house in La Verrière.

Disappearances

André Gachy
On May 19, 1982, Sedrati and Gachy went on vacation in Thonon-les-Bains, resting at a local resort for a few days before leaving. At one point, however, Gachy vanished without a trace, but strangely, Sedrati did not report his disappearance to authorities and instead started using his friend's identity papers and checkbook, as well as living at his residences in La Verrière and Saintes. Owing to the fact that he was an adult with few friends other than Sedrati, no investigation took place to investigate the man's disappearance.

In the summer of 1982, an employee of a shop in La Rochelle noticed that Sedrati was fraudulently buying products using a fake identity and reported him to the police. After his arrest, investigators learned that the scamming techniques he had used were similar to the ones he had used in the past, and suspected that Gachy might have fallen victim to a homicide. In August of that year, in spite of his protests of innocence and the fact that Gachy's body had not been found, Sedrati was charged with murder and identity theft. He then spent the next three years and three months in prison, awaiting trial at the cour d'assises in Nancy.

On November 26, 1985, the trial began. The public prosecutor demanded a life sentence for the accused, but as there was little evidence to convict him, Sedrati was instead acquitted of all charges and released after just four days. On September 6, 1988, he was interned for a few months at a psychiatric ward for "behavioral disorders", but was released again on December 17. In 1993, Sedrati impersonated a man by the name of Joël Royer, and then another man by the name of Vosger, using both identities intermittently as to avoid detection.

Léon Krauss
In October 1994, 62-year-old Léon Krauss, a pensioner living by himself at an apartment in Villeneuve-Saint-Georges, mysteriously vanished. His disappearance went unnoticed at first and allowed Sedrati to settle into his apartment and use his identity papers and bank accounts. Soon after, the building's janitor received a letter, supposedly written by Krauss, in which he claimed to have rented his apartment to Sedrati. One of Krauss' cousins also received a letter, in which it was claimed that Krauss had left the region to start a new life with a woman by the name of Colette.

On December 24, 1994, Sedrati went to the police station in Strasbourg and, pretending to be Krauss, asked that they inform his "family" to stop pestering him before he abruptly left. Approximately four months later, Krauss' family members alerted the police, claiming that the man who claimed to be their relative was an impostor and that the letters' handwriting did not match. At their request, they were provided with a photograph of the man, whom they recognized as Sedrati. This alerted the authorities, as they had previously dealt with him not only due to his various acts of fraud, but also his acquittal in the supposed murder of his friend years prior.

In the spring of 1995, Sedrati was arrested and incarcerated at the Saint-Mihiel Detention Centre to await trial. He was initially charged with murder, as Krauss' body was never located, this charge was dropped in favor of the identity theft, of which he was convicted and sentenced to a 5-year prison term. During his time at Saint-Mihiel, Sedrati worked as a hairdresser and befriended several prisoners: Hans Gassen, Hans Müller, Gérard Steil, Jean-Claude Martini and Norbert Ronfort.

Release and association with Gassen and Steil
On March 16, 1999, Sedrati was paroled. Almost immediately after his release, he resumed using the name of Royer in order to obtain cyanide, before moving into the home of a man named Jean Stauffer in Nancy, to whom he presented himself as "Philippe Grossiord". In April of that year, he bought a woodchipper and reconnected with Gassen and Steil, both of whom had also been released from prison by then. At that time, Gassen lived and worked in Germany while Steil worked as a delivery driver for a hostel in Strasbourg.

A month later, Sedrati made a contract with Steil using his Grossiord alias, in which the latter would work at a fictitious company named 'Inter Europe Diffusion'. Not realizing that Grossiord was Sedrati, Steil accepted the offer and made arrangements to travel to Nancy.

Murders
On May 14, 1999, Steil boarded a train bounded for Nancy, telling his family that he was going for a job interview and would be back three days later. Once he arrived at the location provided by his new "employer", Steil immediately recognized Sedrati, who offered to him to spend the evening at his place to celebrate their reunion. While he was distracted, Sedrati poured potassium cyanide into a cup of coffeea and served it to Steil, who quickly succumed to its poisonous effects.

Once he confirmed that he was dead, Sedrati spent the next several hours dismembering his body, before loading the remains into his vehicle and disposing of them in the nearby canal. He then cleaned the entire apartment to erase any evidence and called the hostel Steil was staying at, claiming that the would not be coming back as he had started working at his company.

Days later, Gassen invited Sedrati to join him, Hans and Rosemarie Müller for a 55th birthday party at their apartment in Germany. At said party, Rosemarie gifted Gassen a yellow shirt as a birthday present, and for the rest of the night, the attendees partied until Sedrati said that he had to go back to his house in Nancy. On May 21, at approximately 3 AM, Gassen left his home to meet Sedrati for some sort of business meeting. Müller, his roommate, was worried and contacted him by phone, but was only contacted hours later by Gassen, who by then had arrived at Sedrati's house, and assured him that he would call back later. In the meantime, Sedrati prepared a cup of coffee for Gassen, which he had secretly poisoned with potassium cyanide. Upon drinking it, the man collapsed and died within seconds. Not long after, a concerned Müller called on Sedrati's cellphone and insisted that he talk to his roommate, but Sedrati said that he was resting at the moment. After hearing this response, Müller suggested that he give some coffee to Gassen, to which their mutual friend responded that he had already done. Relieved by his response, Müller ended the call, allowing Sedrati to proceed with dismembering the remains, which he then threw into the canal.

A day later, fearing that something might have happened to Gassen, Müller decided to report his disappearance to the police. However, as Gassen was an adult and had only been missing for 24 hours, the report was not taken seriously and eventually dismissed altogether. During that time, Sedrati had managed to clean up his apartment and remove all traces of Gassen's DNA.

Discovery of the bodies

On May 30, a fisherman discovered a human right foot in the Nancy canal and immediately notified the police, who quickly arrived at the scene. At first, the officers believed that the foot might have been severed by a propeller. On the following day, a completely rotten and unrecognizable human head was found 500 meters away from where the foot had been found.

In early June, bones, a sternum, some ribs and three kneecaps were recovered from the canal, followed by a hand. Large body parts were recovered from the canal until June 7, when the left foot of one of the victims was recovered. Three days later, a forensic pathologist concluded that all the body parts had been surgically removed, and thus concluded that the manner of death was homicidal in nature. However, as they were unable to obtain fingerprints due to the advanced state of decomposition, local authorities sent the hand for analysis in Paris.

Revelation
In July 1999, the hand was identified as belonging to German national Hans Gassen, who had been released from the Saint-Mihiel Detention Centre the previous year. Following the identification, they learned that he had lived with another German, Hans Müller, another ex-convict who had reported his friend missing on May 22, eight days before the remains were recovered from the canal. When questioned, Müller said that he had attempted to report his friend missing after he had not returned his calls for an entire day, but received no feedback from law enforcement.

At the same time, the police learned that Gassen was receiving numerous phone calls from two places: a home in Nancy and an apartment in the same city. A search of both properties revealed that a certain Philippe Grossiord had regularly called Gassen, with them realizing that it was an alias used by convicted fraudster and a former cellmate of the murder victim - Nadir Sedrati. In the meantime, sensing that the authorities were on his trail, Sedrati decided to change his modus operandi: again using the Grossiord alias, he contacted Ronfort and offered to sell him a motorhome through his fictitious company. As he had wanted to buy one, Ronfort accepted the offer and agreed to meet with the caller. However, upon discovering that the man was actually Sedrati, Ronfort was beaten to death and his skull crushed with a blade grinder before Sedrati hid his body in an unknown location. Ronfort's body has not been found to this day.

Ronfort's sudden disappearance was linked to Sedrati at this time by police, who planned to arrest him solely for Gassen's murder. In the meantime, Sedrati managed to dismember Ronfort's body and hide it, before proceeding to clean his residence to remove all traces of blood.

Arrest and trial
On 21 July 1999, Nadir Sedrati was arrested as he was about to return to his home in Nancy, probably as he planned to get rid of his woodchipper. Meanwhile, Müller was also arrested by German police and sent to one of their police stations for interrogation.

While under interrogation by German police, Müller proved his innocence by providing phone records that showed that he was at home at the time of Gassen's disappearance. Sedrati, however, falsely claimed that Müller had killed Gassen, supposedly over an argument: according to his version, the three men were doing some sort of business deal with two Dutchmen and a Moroccan, and as he did not want to be involved, Sedrati on his way to leave when he heard Gassen and Müller engage in a bitter argument. When he went back to check out what was going on, he then supposedly saw Müller kill Gassen.

This story was not taken seriously by either French or German police, with the former issuing a search warrant on the apartment. When they arrived, they found a woodchipper, a kitchen knife, a butcher's saw and several brownish stains on the floor, sink and on the woodchipper itself. Furthermore, a more thorough inspection led to the discovery of a jar filled with mysterious white powder, which had been hidden inside a cushion. At first, it was believed that the powder was some kind of drug (either cocaine or heroin), but an analysis revealed that it was in fact potassium cyanide. Because of this, investigators constructed a theory that surmized that Sedrati likely poisoned Gassen and then dismembered his body with the instruments found at the apartment. However, the advanced state of decomposition still puzzled the authorities, who decided to search further. A closer inspection led to the discovery of quicklime in the basement: this led authorities to believe that Gassen's head was likely submerged in it so it could decompose at a faster rate.

On 23 July, after two days in police custody, Sedrati was charged with Gassen's murder. He professed his innocence while incarcerated, and police were unable to identify a motive beyond potentially stealing money, as Sedrati had withdrawn 300 francs using Gassen's credit card.

Discovery of the second body
At the end of July, the police were given the task of solving the mystery of whose the remaining body parts were. Delving further into Sedrati's past, they learned that two of his acquaintances, Gérard Steil and Norbert Ronfort, had also gone missing. Believing that the body parts might belong to either of the two men, they contacted the family members and requested a DNA sample, which they successfully obtained after some complications.

While waiting for the results, investigators established that Steil was last seen alive on May 15, when he was supposed to have a job interview with "Grossiord". They were again unable to establish a reasonable motive beyond the belief that Sedrati had killed Steil for his meager pension. In September, DNA confirmed that the third kneecap found in the canal did indeed belong to Steil, and because of this, the police decided to dredge the entire canal in an attempt to find more remains. Their efforts were rewarded in November, when more remains were indeed located. Because of this, Sedrati was charged with Steil's murder, which he also denied. Alongside this, authorities found the identity papers of Ronfort, which led them to believe that his remains were somewhere in the canal too.

Unsuccessful searches for the third and fourth bodies
In December, another investigation was launched in order to find Ronfort, who was missing since July 19 and was last seen on a trip to buy a motorhome. By examining his phone calls, they learned that he planned to buy it from the same phony company Sedrati had used to lure the previous victims. However, after two months of searching, they were unable to locate any remains, leading them to believe that Sedrati had hastily disposed of them due to his impending arrest.

On March 22, 2000, Sedrati was charged with Ronfort's murder. Although he denied all three murders, he was remanded to await trial in August 2001. While this was ongoing, investigations were reopened in the disappearance of Krauss, but as there was insufficient evidence to charge Sedrati with any crime, it was eventually dismissed.

Trial
On 25 April 2002, Sedrati's trial began at the cour d'assises in Meurthe-et-Moselle. Throughout the proceedings, Sedrati continued to arrogantly proclaim that he was innocent of all charges, which was initially backed up by the fact that nothing incriminating was found on the shredder found in his kitchen. However, the blood found on the linoleum and on the sink quickly changed that, as it indicated that he did indeed kill his victims in the kitchen.

On May 3, 2002, Sedrati was found guilty on all counts and sentenced to life imprisonment. Still professing his innocence, he appealed the ruling.

Appeals trial
On 19 May 2003, Sedrati's appeal trial began before the cour d'assises in Metz. During the course of the proceedings, a dramatic turn of events occurred when a female prisoner who knew Ronfort claimed to have seen the man alive in 2000, over a year after Sedrati was arrested. As her testimony seemed genuine and in good faith, the claim was taken into consideration as possible evidence that Ronfort was still alive.

When it came to the psychiatric reports, experts stated that Sedrati had a "perverse, almost cannibalistic" personality and that he was a manipulator who enjoyed toying with people to the extent of simulating insanity by eating his own excrement and drinking his own urine. Jurors eventually disregarded the young woman's testimony when they learned that Ronfort's blood had been found in Sedrati's apartment, and because of this, he was found guilty yet again, receiving a life term with 22 years preventative detention.

Following his second trial, Sedrati filed an appeal to the Court of Cassation, which rejected his appeal on October 7, 2004. Since then, he has remained in prison, but has been eligibile for parole since July 2021.

Advances in DNA
The 1990s were a big step for genetics, as it led to the rise of DNA. During the investigation, DNA and recent software made it possible to identify Gassen with the help of the Paris Forensic Center, later leading to the location and identification of additional evidence relating to Steil and Ronfort. The lack of such technologies were a crucial reason why Sedrati avoided imprisonment for his likely involvement in the disappearances of Gachy and Krauss, and because of this, attorney François Robinet has stated that he firmly believes Sedrati to be responsible. He has also said that Sedrati might have killed others between 1985 and 1995, and possibly even before 1982.

See also 
 List of serial killers by country

References

TV documentaries 
 "Nadir Sedrati, the cutter of the canal" in May 2005, March 2007 and July 2009 in Get the Accused presented by Christophe Hondelatte on France 2.
 "The Sedrati Affair, the detachment of the canal" December 1, 2010 in Criminal Investigations: the magazine of the facts on W9 rebroadcast in Criminal Records on Number 23.
 «Nadir Sédrati: The serial killer of the Nancy canal» in Crimes in the East on France 3.

External links 
 Gérard Steil death notice
 Complete file on L'Est républicain.
 Document gathering articles published in L'Est républicain (format PDF).
 Pictures of the case published in L'Est républicain.

1938 births
20th-century French criminals
French fraudsters
French male criminals
French serial killers
French people convicted of murder
French people of Algerian descent
French prisoners and detainees
French prisoners sentenced to life imprisonment
Living people
Male serial killers
People acquitted of murder
People convicted of murder by France
People convicted of fraud
People from Isère
Poisoners
Prisoners and detainees of France
Prisoners sentenced to life imprisonment by France